Ugo, conte di Parigi (Hugo, Count of Paris) is a tragedia lirica, or tragic opera, in two acts by Gaetano Donizetti. Felice Romani wrote the Italian libretto after Hippolyte-Louis-Florent Bis's Blanche d'Aquitaine. It premiered on 13 March 1832 at La Scala, Milan.

Roles

Synopsis 

Time: 10th century
Place: Paris

See synopsis on opera-rara.com

Recordings

References
Notes

Cited sources
Osborne, Charles, (1994),  The Bel Canto Operas of Rossini, Donizetti, and Bellini,  Portland, Oregon: Amadeus Press. 

Other sources
Allitt, John Stewart (1991), Donizetti: in the light of Romanticism and the teaching of Johann Simon Mayr, Shaftesbury: Element Books, Ltd (UK); Rockport, MA: Element, Inc.(USA)
Ashbrook, William (1982), Donizetti and His Operas, Cambridge University Press.    
Ashbrook, William (1998), "Donizetti, Gaetano" in Stanley Sadie  (Ed.),  The New Grove Dictionary of Opera, Vol. One. London: Macmillan Publishers, Inc.   
Ashbrook, William and Sarah Hibberd (2001), in  Holden, Amanda (Ed.), The New Penguin Opera Guide, New York: Penguin Putnam. .  pp. 224 - 247.
Black, John (1982), Donizetti’s Operas in Naples, 1822—1848. London: The Donizetti Society.
Loewenberg, Alfred (1970). Annals of Opera, 1597-1940, 2nd edition.  Rowman and Littlefield
Sadie, Stanley, (Ed.); John Tyrell (Exec. Ed.) (2004), The New Grove Dictionary of Music and Musicians.  2nd edition. London: Macmillan.    (hardcover).   (eBook).
 Weinstock, Herbert (1963), Donizetti and the World of Opera in Italy, Paris, and Vienna in the First Half of the Nineteenth Century, New York: Pantheon Books.

External links

  Donizetti Society (London) website
 Libretto at ItalianOpera 

1832 operas
Italian-language operas
Opera world premieres at La Scala
Operas
Operas by Gaetano Donizetti
Operas set in the 10th century
Operas set in Paris
Operas based on plays
Libretti by Felice Romani